Nyctemera regularis is a moth of the family Erebidae first described by Snellen in 1880. It is found on Sumatra, Java and Borneo.

Subspecies
Nyctemera regularis regularis (Sumatra)
Nyctemera regularis crameri Roepke, 1949 (Java)
Nyctemera regularis snelleni Pagenstecher, 1901 (Borneo)

References

Nyctemerina
Moths described in 1880